Redlands Municipal Airport  is two miles (3.2 km) northeast of downtown Redlands, serving San Bernardino County, California, United States.

History

The Redlands area witnessed some of the nation's earliest general aviation activity. The first recorded air meet held in the Redlands area (sponsored by the University of Redlands) was in 1911. In 1916, Beryl Williams founded the Redlands Aircraft Company in the town. He is remembered for painting his biplane in light blue paint, hoping to render it invisible from the ground.

In 1947 Robert Kanaga and Austin Welch built the Redlands Flying Inn Airport (including a  runway, a maintenance shop, and a hangar), which marked the first official airport for the city. Kanaga was called for military duty during the Korean War, and the duo offered to sell the airport to the city. The sale was not concluded, since the city did not have the necessary funds available, so the property was purchased by the Southern California Turkey Growers Association; who used the property as a turkey and chicken ranch. In the late 1950s, Roy Haskins and Alexander Theos purchased the turkey ranch, and began to refurbish the buildings to restore it as an aviation facility.
 
In 1962, with the help of a $20,000 loan from Lockheed, the city purchased land to expand the airport site and make the airport a municipal facility. Several airport improvement projects followed to extend and widen the runway, install lights, erect a beacon, and install perimeter fencing.

The beacon and the adjacent hangar (now operated by Blue Raven Aviation) is a prominent landmark for Redlands airport. The beacon and its tower were surplus FAA equipment donated to the city of Redlands in 1966. The beacon was originally installed on Box Springs Mountain near March Air Force Base. The US Airway Beacon system used lights and later radio beams to guide pilots navigating cross-country.

Current use
The airport has a fixed-base operator with a fueling station, flight training schools, and various aircraft repair and refurbishing establishments. Redlands is also home to EAA Chapter 845, an active chapter. The Redlands Airport Association, formed in June 2014, is dedicated to the preservation and promotion of Redlands Airport.

Airline service
In the 1970s two airlines flew to Redlands from Los Angeles: Hughes Airwest Fairchild F-27s and Golden West Airlines de Havilland Canada DHC-6 Twin Otters.

References

External links

Buildings and structures in Redlands, California
Airports in San Bernardino County, California